Charles Eugène of Lorraine (25 September 1751 – 2 November 1825) was the head of and last male member of the House of Guise, the cadet branch of the House of Lorraine which dominated France during the Wars of Religion, remained prominent as princes étrangers at court throughout the ancien régime, and participated in the émigré efforts to restore the Bourbons to the throne. He was an officer in the French and Habsburg militaries during the French Revolutionary and Napoleonic wars.

Biography

Born on 25 September 1751 in Versailles, France, to Louis, Prince of Brionne and his third wife, Princess Louise of Rohan (1734-1815). Charles Eugène was a peer of France and Prince of Lorraine, styled as the Prince of Lambesc. One of four children, he had a younger brother and two younger sisters. Through his sister, Princess Joséphine of Lorraine, he was an uncle of Charles Emmanuel, Prince of Carignano and great uncle of the future King Charles Albert of Sardinia.

First marriage
He married twice; firstly to a rich Polish noblewoman, Anna Cetner (1764–1814), whom he wed on 20 May 1803. She was daughter of Ignacy Cetner, Palatine of Bełz (1728-1800) and Countess Ludwika Potocka (1744-1800). The couple had no issue.

Second marriage
After the death of his first wife, he married again to Victoire de Folliot de Crenneville (1766–1845) on 23 Jan 1816, former governess of Marie Louise, Empress of the French. She was daughter of French nobleman François Méderic Folliot de Crenneville (1735-1802) and Anne Pierrette Charlotte du Poutet (b. 1746). At the time of her marriage to Prince Charles Eugène Viktoria was already twice widowed: Baroness du Poutet and Countess von Colloredo-Wallsee. Again, the couple had no children and they divorced in 1817.

Military career

French military service
The eldest of House of Lothringen-Lambesc served as the King of France's Grand Equerry.  Charles Eugène became Colonel and Proprietor (Chief) of the Royal Allemand-Dragoons in 1778 and was promoted to Marshal of the Camp in the French Army on 9 March 1788. He received the Commanders Cross of the Order of Saint Louis.

In the early days of the French Revolution, Charles Eugène's Allemand Dragoons were an important element in the protection of the Louis' Court. On 12 July 1789, Charles Eugène rode at the head of his dragoons across the Place of Louis XV into the Tuileries Gardens, against a mob that had gathered there and forced the group out of the garden.

In the course of the attack, many were injured, and Charles Eugène was held popularly responsible, although no charges were filed.

He defended the royal palace in the riot at the Tuileries Gardens in July 1789. Initially he served in the French army, but at the outset of France's wars with Austria, he picked up the Bourbon cause in Germany.

When hostilities between France and the Habsburgs reached a crisis point in 1791, he left his Allemand Dragoons and followed the Bourbon cause with his younger brother, Joseph, Prince of Vaudémont.

Habsburg military service
On 18 June 1791, the prince was appointed major general in the Austrian army. In October 1791, he was given command of a brigade composed of the Freikorps (volunteers) "Degelmann" and 37th Dragoon Regiment  in Flanders.

On 1 February 1793, his regiment, the 37th Dragoons, was taken into Habsburg service and in 1798, it was united with the 10th Cuirassier Regiment. At the Battle of Tournai on 22 May 1794, he charged the French infantry on the heights of Templeuve with four squadrons (approximately 1,000 men) of the 18th Chevauxleger Regiment "Karaiczay", cutting down 500 men and taking three guns. On 22 June 1794, he was appointed Colonel and Proprietor of the 21st of Cuirassier Regiment in recognition  of his actions. In the Battle of Fleurus, on 26 June 1794, he charged with four squadrons of  5th Carabiners Albert to rescue part of Campaign Marshal Prince von Kaunitz's infantry, which had been surrounded by three French cavalry regiments. This unlikely charge against another cavalry force more than five times its size took the French by surprise; the French cavalry scattered, giving Kaunitz to organize an orderly withdrawal of his own force from the field.

On 4 March 1796, Charles Eugène was promoted to Lieutenant Field Marshal . In 1796 he served in Germany under Field Marshal Dagobert Sigmund von Wurmser in the Army of the Upper Rhine; on 11 May of that year, he was awarded the Commander's Cross of the Military Order of Maria Theresa Order. He fought with distinction at the Battle of Amberg on 24 August and in the Battle of Würzburg on 2 September, commanding a brigade of cavalry.

In the War of the Second Coalition, the Prince fought in Swabia at the Battle of Engen. After this campaign, the prince was posted to the Habsburg province Galicia, where he was governor general. On 3 December 1806, he was promoted to General of Cavalry and a few weeks later, captain of the First Arcièren Life Guard in Vienna; he was also awarded the Order of the Golden Fleece in 1808.

Bourbon restoration
Upon the Bourbon restoration in 1815, his dynastic dignities were restored to him, but due to widespread unpopularity in France, he never returned to exercise his privileges. He died in Vienna in 1825. After the restoration of Louis XVIII, he was created again Peer of France, and his dignities further enhanced by the title Duke of Elbeuf. Louis XVIII furthermore appointed him as a Marshal of France. Because of the popular hostility against him in France, relating to the incident in the Tuileries in July 1789, he never exercised these privileges and he died at the age of 74 in Vienna on 21 November 1825. As he had no children, and with his death, and his brother's, the male line of old Lothringen lines of Elbœuf, Harcourt, and Armagnac ended.

Ancestry

Sources

Notes and citations

Bibliography

 Ebert, Jens-Florian.   "Lothringen". Die Österreichischen Generäle 1792–1815. Napoleon Online.DE. Accessed 23 January 2010.
Smith, Digby. Lothringen-Lambesc.  Leopold Kudrna and Digby Smith (compilers). A biographical dictionary of all Austrian Generals in the French Revolutionary and Napoleonic Wars, 1792–1815. The Napoleon Series, Robert Burnham, editor in chief. April 2008 version. Accessed 23 January 2010.
 Spawforth, Antony. Versailles: a biography of a palace. New York: St. Martin's Press, 2008, 

1751 births
1825 deaths
People from Versailles
Austrian Empire military leaders of the French Revolutionary Wars
Military leaders of the French Revolutionary Wars
Knights of the Golden Fleece of Austria
Grand Crosses of the Order of Saint Louis
19th-century Austrian military personnel
Austrian Empire commanders of the Napoleonic Wars
House of Guise
House of Lorraine
Dukes of Elbeuf
18th-century French nobility
19th-century French nobility
French generals
French military personnel
Princes of Lorraine
18th-century peers of France
Members of the Chamber of Peers of the Bourbon Restoration